The Secret Intelligence Service (SIS), commonly known as MI6 (Military Intelligence, Section 6), is the foreign intelligence service of the United Kingdom, tasked mainly with the covert overseas collection and analysis of human intelligence in support of the UK's national security. SIS is one of the British intelligence agencies and the Chief of the Secret Intelligence Service ("C") is directly accountable to the Foreign Secretary.

Formed in 1909 as the foreign section of the Secret Service Bureau, the section grew greatly during the First World War officially adopting its current name around 1920. The name "MI6" (meaning Military Intelligence, Section 6) originated as a convenient label during the Second World War, when SIS was known by many names. It is still commonly used today. The existence of SIS was not officially acknowledged until 1994. That year the Intelligence Services Act 1994 (ISA) was introduced to Parliament, to place the organisation on a statutory footing for the first time. It provides the legal basis for its operations. Today, SIS is subject to public oversight by the Investigatory Powers Tribunal and the Intelligence and Security Committee of Parliament.

The stated priority roles of SIS are counter-terrorism, counter-proliferation, providing intelligence in support of cyber security, and supporting stability overseas to disrupt terrorism and other criminal activities.  Unlike its main sister agencies, Security Service (MI5) and Government Communications Headquarters (GCHQ), SIS works exclusively in foreign intelligence gathering; the ISA allows it to carry out operations only against persons outside the British Islands. Some of SIS's actions since the 2000s have attracted significant controversy, such as its alleged complicity in acts of enhanced interrogation techniques and extraordinary rendition.

Since 1994, SIS headquarters have been in the SIS Building in London, on the South Bank of the River Thames.

History and development

Foundation
The service derived from the Secret Service Bureau, which was founded on 1 October 1909. The Bureau was a joint initiative of the Admiralty and the War Office to control secret intelligence operations in the UK and overseas, particularly concentrating on the activities of the Imperial German government.  The bureau was split into naval and army sections which, over time, specialised in foreign espionage and internal counter-espionage activities, respectively. This specialisation was because the Admiralty wanted to know the maritime strength of the Imperial German Navy. This specialisation was formalised before 1914. During the First World War in 1916, the two sections underwent administrative changes so that the foreign section became the section MI1(c) of the Directorate of Military Intelligence.

Its first director was Captain Sir Mansfield George Smith-Cumming, who often dropped the Smith in routine communication. He typically signed correspondence with his initial C in green ink. This usage evolved as a code name, and has been adhered to by all subsequent directors of SIS when signing documents to retain anonymity.

First World War
The service's performance during the First World War was mixed, because it was unable to establish a network in Germany itself. Most of its results came from military and commercial intelligence collected through networks in neutral countries, occupied territories, and Russia. During the war, MI6 had its main European office in Rotterdam from where it coordinated espionage in Germany and occupied Belgium.

Inter-war period

After the war, resources were significantly reduced but during the 1920s, SIS established a close operational relationship with the diplomatic service. In August 1919, Cumming created the new passport control department, providing diplomatic cover for agents abroad. The post of Passport Control Officer provided operatives with diplomatic immunity.

Circulating Sections established intelligence requirements and passed the intelligence back to its consumer departments, mainly the War Office and Admiralty.

The debate over the future structure of British Intelligence continued at length after the end of hostilities but Cumming managed to engineer the return of the Service to Foreign Office control. At this time, the organisation was known in Whitehall by a variety of titles including the Foreign Intelligence Service, the Secret Service, MI1(c), the Special Intelligence Service and even C's organisation. Around 1920, it began increasingly to be referred to as the Secret Intelligence Service (SIS), a title that it has continued to use to the present day and which was enshrined in statute in the Intelligence Services Act 1994. During the Second World War, the name MI6 was used as a flag of convenience, the name by which it is frequently known in popular culture since.

In the immediate post-war years under Sir Mansfield George Smith-Cumming and throughout most of the 1920s, SIS was focused on Communism, in particular, Russian Bolshevism. Examples include a thwarted operation to overthrow the Bolshevik government in 1918 by SIS agents Sidney George Reilly and Sir Robert Bruce Lockhart, as well as more orthodox espionage efforts within early Soviet Russia headed by Captain George Hill.

Smith-Cumming died suddenly at his home on 14 June 1923, shortly before he was due to retire, and was replaced as C by Admiral Sir Hugh "Quex" Sinclair. Sinclair created the following sections:
 A central foreign counter-espionage Circulating Section, Section V, to liaise with the Security Service to collate counter-espionage reports from overseas stations.
 An economic intelligence section, Section VII, to deal with trade, industry and contraband.
 A clandestine radio communications organisation, Section VIII, to communicate with operatives and agents overseas.
 Section N to exploit the contents of foreign diplomatic bags
 Section D to conduct political covert actions and paramilitary operations in time of war. Section D would organise the Home Defence Scheme resistance organisation in the UK and come to be the foundation of the Special Operations Executive (SOE) during the Second World War.

With the emergence of Germany as a threat following the ascendence of the Nazis, in the early 1930s attention was shifted in that direction.

MI6 assisted the Gestapo, the Nazi secret police, with "the exchange of information about communism" as late as October 1937, well into the Nazi era; the head of the British agency's Berlin station, Frank Foley, was still able to describe his relationship with the Gestapo's so-called communism expert as "cordial".

Sinclair died in 1939, after an illness, and was replaced as C by Lt Col. Stewart Menzies (Horse Guards), who had been with the service since the end of World War I.

On 26 and 27 July 1939, in Pyry near Warsaw,  British military intelligence representatives including Dilly Knox, Alastair Denniston and Humphrey Sandwith were introduced by their allied Polish counterparts into their Enigma-decryption techniques and equipment, including Zygalski sheets and the cryptologic "Bomba", and were promised future delivery of a reverse-engineered, Polish-built duplicate Enigma machine. The demonstration represented a vital basis for the later British continuation and effort. During the war, British cryptologists decrypted a vast number of messages enciphered on Enigma. The intelligence gleaned from this source, codenamed "Ultra" by the British, was a substantial aid to the Allied war effort.

Second World War
During the Second World War the human intelligence work of the service was complemented by several other initiatives:
 The cryptanalytic effort undertaken by the Government Code and Cypher School (GC&CS), the bureau responsible for interception and decryption of foreign communications at Bletchley Park. (See above.)
 The extensive 'double-cross' system run by MI5 to feed misleading intelligence to the Germans.
 Imagery intelligence activities conducted by the RAF Photographic Reconnaissance Unit (now JARIC, The National Imagery Exploitation Centre).

GC&CS was the source of Ultra intelligence, which was very useful.

The chief of SIS, Stewart Menzies, insisted on wartime control of codebreaking, and this gave him immense power and influence, which he used judiciously. By distributing the Ultra material collected by the Government Code & Cypher School, MI6 became, for the first time, an important branch of the government. Extensive breaches of Nazi Enigma signals gave Menzies and his team enormous insight into Adolf Hitler's strategy, and this was kept a closely held secret.

The British intelligence services signed a special agreement with their allied Polish counterparts 1940. In July 2005, the British and Polish governments jointly produced a two-volume study of bilateral intelligence cooperation in the War, which revealed information that had until then been officially secret. The Report of the Anglo-Polish Historical Committee was written by leading historians and experts who had been granted unprecedented access to British intelligence archives, and concluded that 48 percent of all reports received by British secret services from continental Europe in 1939–45 had come from Polish sources. This was facilitated by the fact that occupied Poland had a tradition of insurgency organisations passed down through generations, with networks in emigre Polish communities in Germany and France. A major part of Polish resistance activity was clandestine and involved cellular intelligence networks; while Nazi Germany used Poles as forced labourers across the continent, putting them in a unique position to spy on the enemy. Liaison was undertaken by SIS officer Wilfred Dunderdale, and reports included advance warning of the Afrikakorps' departure for Libya, awareness of the readiness of Vichy French units to fight against the Allies or switch sides in Operation Torch, and advance warning both of Operation Barbarossa and Operation Edelweiss, the German Caucasus campaign. Polish-sourced reporting on German secret weapons began in 1941, and Operation Wildhorn enabled a British special operations flight to airlift a V-2 Rocket that had been captured by the Polish resistance. Polish secret agent Jan Karski delivered the British the first Allied intelligence on the Holocaust. Via a female Polish agent, the British also had a channel to the anti-Nazi chief of the Abwehr, Admiral Wilhelm Canaris.

1939 saw the most significant failure of the service during the war, known as the Venlo incident for the Dutch town where much of the operation took place. Agents of the German army secret service, the Abwehr, and the counter-espionage section of the Sicherheitsdienst (SD), posed as high-ranking officers involved in a plot to depose Hitler. In a series of meetings between SIS agents and the 'conspirators', SS plans to abduct the SIS team were shelved due to the presence of Dutch police. On the night of 8–9 November, a meeting took place without police presence. There, the two SIS agents were duly abducted by the SS.

In 1940, journalist and Soviet agent Kim Philby applied for a vacancy in Section D of SIS, and was vetted by his friend and fellow Soviet agent Guy Burgess. When Section D was absorbed by Special Operations Executive (SOE) in summer of 1940, Philby was appointed as an instructor in black propaganda at the SOE's training establishment in Beaulieu, Hampshire.

In May 1940, MI6 set up British Security Co-ordination (BSC), on the authorisation of Prime Minister Winston Churchill over the objections of Stewart Menzies. This was a covert organisation based in New York City, headed by William Stephenson intended to investigate enemy activities, prevent sabotage against British interests in the Americas, and mobilise pro-British opinion in the Americas. BSC also founded Camp X in Canada to train clandestine operators and to establish (in 1942) a telecommunications relay station, code name Hydra, operated by engineer Benjamin deForest Bayly.

In early 1944, MI6 re-established Section IX, its prewar anti-Soviet section, and Philby took a position there. He was able to alert the NKVD about all British intelligence on the Soviets—including what the American OSS had shared with the British about the Soviets.

Despite these difficulties the service nevertheless conducted substantial and successful operations in both occupied Europe and in the Middle East and Far East where it operated under the cover name Inter-Services Liaison Department (ISLD).

Cold War
In August 1945 Soviet intelligence officer Konstantin Volkov tried to defect to the UK, offering the names of all Soviet agents working inside British intelligence. Philby received the memo on Volkov's offer and alerted the Soviets, so they could arrest him. In 1946, SIS absorbed the "rump" remnant of the Special Operations Executive (SOE), dispersing the latter's personnel and equipment between its operational divisions or "controllerates" and new Directorates for Training and Development and for War Planning. The 1921 arrangement was streamlined with the geographical, operational units redesignated "Production Sections", sorted regionally under Controllers, all under a Director of Production. The Circulating Sections were renamed "Requirements Sections" and placed under a Directorate of Requirements.

Following the Second World War, tens of thousands of Holocaust survivors attempted to reach Palestine as part of the Aliyah Bet refugee movement. As part of British government efforts to stem this migration, Operation Embarrass saw the SIS bomb five ships in Italy in 1947-48 to prevent them being used by the refugees, and set up a fake Palestinian group to take responsibility for the attacks. However, some in SIS wanted the policy to go further, noting that "intimidation is only likely to be effective if some members of the group of people to be intimidated actually suffer unpleasant consequences" and criticising the decision to not take stronger action against Exodus 1947 (which was, instead, seized and returned to mainland Europe).

SIS operations against the USSR were extensively compromised by the presence of an agent working for the Soviet Union, Harold Adrian Russell "Kim" Philby, in the post-war Counter-Espionage Section, R5. SIS suffered further embarrassment when it turned out that an officer involved in both the Vienna and Berlin tunnel operations had been turned as a Soviet agent during internment by the Chinese during the Korean War. This agent, George Blake, returned from his internment to be treated as something of a hero by his contemporaries in "the office". His security authorisation was restored, and in 1953 he was posted to the Vienna Station where the original Vienna tunnels had been running for years. After compromising these to his Soviet controllers, he was subsequently assigned to the British team involved on Operation Gold, the Berlin tunnel, and which was, consequently, blown from the outset. In 1956, SIS Director John Sinclair had to resign after the botched affair of the death of Lionel Crabb.

SIS activities included a range of covert political actions, including the overthrow of Mohammed Mossadeq in Iran in the 1953 Iranian coup d'état (in collaboration with the US Central Intelligence Agency).

Despite earlier Soviet penetration, SIS began to recover as a result of improved vetting and security, and a series of successful penetrations. From 1958, SIS had three moles in the Polish UB, the most successful of which was codenamed NODDY. The CIA described the information SIS received from these Poles as "some of the most valuable intelligence ever collected", and rewarded SIS with $20 million to expand their Polish operation. In 1961 Polish defector Michael Goleniewski exposed George Blake as a Soviet agent. Blake was identified, arrested, tried for espionage and sent to prison. He escaped and was exfiltrated to the USSR in 1966.

Also, in the GRU, they recruited Colonel Oleg Penkovsky. Penkovsky ran for two years as a considerable success, providing several thousand photographed documents, including Red Army rocketry manuals that allowed US National Photographic Interpretation Center (NPIC) analysts to recognise the deployment pattern of Soviet SS4 MRBMs and SS5 IRBMs in Cuba in October 1962. SIS operations against the USSR continued to gain pace through the remainder of the Cold War, arguably peaking with the recruitment in the 1970s of Oleg Gordievsky who SIS ran for the better part of a decade, then successfully exfiltrated from the USSR across the Finnish border in 1985.

During the Soviet–Afghan War, SIS supported the Islamic resistance group commanded by Ahmad Shah Massoud and he became a key ally in the fight against the Soviets. An annual mission of two SIS officers, as well as military instructors, were sent to Massoud and his fighters. Through them, weapons and supplies, radios and vital intelligence on Soviet battle plans were all sent to the Afghan resistance. SIS also helped to retrieve crashed Soviet helicopters from Afghanistan.

The real scale and impact of SIS activities during the second half of the Cold War remains unknown, however, because the bulk of their most successful targeting operations against Soviet officials were the result of "Third Country" operations recruiting Soviet sources travelling abroad in Asia and Africa. These included the defection to the SIS Tehran station in 1982 of KGB officer Vladimir Kuzichkin, the son of a senior Politburo member and a member of the KGB's internal Second Chief Directorate who provided SIS and the British government with warning of the mobilisation of the KGB's Alpha Force during the 1991 August Coup which briefly toppled Soviet leader Mikhail Gorbachev.

After the Cold War
The end of the Cold War led to a reshuffle of existing priorities. The Soviet Bloc ceased to swallow the lion's share of operational priorities, although the stability and intentions of a weakened but still nuclear-capable Federal Russia constituted a significant concern. Instead, functional rather than geographical intelligence requirements came to the fore such as counter-proliferation (via the agency's Production and Targeting, Counter-Proliferation Section) which had been a sphere of activity since the discovery of Pakistani physics students studying nuclear-weapons related subjects in 1974; counter-terrorism (via two joint sections run in collaboration with the Security Service, one for Irish republicanism and one for international terrorism); counter-narcotics and serious crime (originally set up under the Western Hemisphere controllerate in 1989); and a 'global issues' section looking at matters such as the environment and other public welfare issues. In the mid-1990s these were consolidated into a new post of Controller, Global and Functional.

During the transition, then-C Sir Colin McColl embraced a new, albeit limited, policy of openness towards the press and public, with 'public affairs' falling into the brief of Director, Counter-Intelligence and Security (renamed Director, Security and Public Affairs). McColl's policies were part and parcel with a wider 'open government initiative' developed from 1993 by the government of John Major. As part of this, SIS operations, and those of the national signals intelligence agency, GCHQ, were placed on a statutory footing through the 1994 Intelligence Services Act. Although the Act provided procedures for authorisations and warrants, this essentially enshrined mechanisms that had been in place at least since 1953 (for authorisations) and 1985 (under the Interception of Communications Act, for warrants). Under this Act, since 1994, SIS and GCHQ activities have been subject to scrutiny by Parliament's Intelligence and Security Committee.

During the mid-1990s the British intelligence community was subjected to a comprehensive costing review by the government. As part of broader defence cut-backs SIS had its resources cut back twenty-five percent across the board and senior management was reduced by forty percent. As a consequence of these cuts, the Requirements division (formerly the Circulating Sections of the 1921 Arrangement) were deprived of any representation on the board of directors. At the same time, the Middle East and Africa controllerates were pared back and amalgamated. According to the findings of Lord Butler of Brockwell's Review of Weapons of Mass Destruction, the reduction of operational capabilities in the Middle East and of the Requirements division's ability to challenge the quality of the information the Middle East Controllerate was providing weakened the Joint Intelligence Committee's estimates of Iraq's non-conventional weapons programmes. These weaknesses were major contributors to the UK's erroneous assessments of Iraq's 'weapons of mass destruction' prior to the 2003 invasion of that country.

On one occasion in 1998, MI6 believed it might be able to obtain 'actionable intelligence' which could help the CIA capture Osama Bin Laden, the leader of Al Qaeda. But given that this might result in his being transferred or rendered to the United States, MI6 decided it had to ask for ministerial approval before passing the intelligence on (in case he faced the death penalty or mistreatment). This was approved by a minister 'provided the CIA gave assurances regarding humane treatment'. In the end, not enough intelligence came through to make it worthwhile going ahead.

In 2001, it became clear that working with Ahmad Shah Massoud and his forces was the best option for going after Bin Laden; the priority for MI6 was developing intelligence coverage. The first real sources were being established, although no one penetrated the upper tier of the Al Qaeda leadership itself. As the year progressed, plans were drawn up and slowly worked their way up to the White House on 4 September 2001-which involved increasing dramatically support for Massoud. MI6 were involved in these plans.

War on Terror
During the Global War on Terror, SIS accepted information from the CIA that was obtained through torture, including the extraordinary rendition programme. Craig Murray, a UK ambassador to Uzbekistan, had written several memos critical of the UK's acceptance of this information; he was then sacked from his job.

Following the September 11 attacks, on 28 September the British Foreign Secretary approved the deployment of MI6 officers to Afghanistan and the wider region, utilising people involved with the mujahadeen in the 1980s and who had language skills and regional expertise. At the end of the month, a handful of MI6 officers with a budget of $7 million landed in northeast Afghanistan, where they met with General Mohammed Fahim of the Northern Alliance and began working with other contacts in the north and south to build alliances, secure support, and to bribe as many Taliban commanders as they could to change sides or leave the fight.

During the United States invasion of Afghanistan, the SIS established a presence in Kabul following its fall to the coalition. MI6 members and the British Special Boat Service took part in the Battle of Tora Bora. After members of the 22nd Special Air Service (SAS) Regiment returned to the UK in mid-December 2001, members of both territorial SAS regiments remained in the country to provide close protection to SIS members.

In mid-December, MI6 officers who had been deployed to the region began to interview prisoners held by the Northern Alliance. In January 2002, they began interviewing prisoners held by the Americans. On 10 January 2002, an MI6 officer conducted his first interview of a detainee held by the Americans. He reported back to London that there were aspects of how the detainee had been handled by the US military before the interview that did not seem consistent with the Geneva Conventions. Two days after the interview, he was sent instructions, copied to all MI5 and MI6 officers in Afghanistan, about how to solve concerns over mistreatment, referring to signs of abuse: "Given that they are not within our custody or control, the law does not require you to intervene to protect this." It went on to say that the Americans had to understand that the UK did not condone such mistreatment and that a complaint should be made to a senior US official if there was any coercion by the US in conjunction with an MI6 interview.

In the run-up to the 2003 invasion of Iraq, it is alleged, although not confirmed, that some SIS members conducted Operation Mass Appeal, which was a campaign to plant stories about Iraq's WMDs in the media. The operation was exposed in The Sunday Times in December 2003. Claims by former weapons inspector Scott Ritter suggest that similar propaganda campaigns against Iraq date back well into the 1990s. Ritter says that SIS recruited him in 1997 to help with the propaganda effort, saying "the aim was to convince the public that Iraq was a far greater threat than it actually was." Towards the end of the invasion, SIS officers operating out of Baghdad International Airport with Special Air Service (SAS) protection, began to re-establish a station in Baghdad and began gathering intelligence, in particular on WMDs. After it became clear that Iraq did not possess any WMDs, MI6 officially withdrew pre-invasion intelligence about them. In the months after the invasion, they also began gathering political intelligence; predicting what would happen in post-Baathist Iraq. MI6 personnel in the country never exceeded 50; in early 2004, apart from supporting Task Force Black in hunting down former senior Ba'athist party members, MI6 also made an effort to target "transnational terrorism"/jihadist networks that led to the SAS carrying out Operation Aston in February 2004: They conducted a raid on a house in Baghdad that was part of a "jihadist pipeline" that ran from Iran to Iraq that US and UK intelligence agencies were tracking suspects on – the raid captured members of Pakistan based terrorist group.

Shortly before the Second Battle of Fallujah, MI6 personnel visited JSOCs TSF (Temporary Screening Facility) at Balad Air Base to question a suspected insurgent. Afterwards, they raised concerns about the poor detention conditions there. As a result, the British government informed JSOC in Iraq that prisoners captured by British special forces would only be turned over to JSOC if there was an undertaking not to send them to Balad. In spring 2005, the SAS detachment operating in Basra and southern Iraq, known as Operation Hathor, escorted MI6 case officers into Basra so they could meet their sources and handlers. MI6 provided information that enabled the detachment to carry out surveillance operations. MI6 were also involved in resolving the Basra prison incident; the SIS played a central role in the British withdrawal from Basra in 2007.

In Afghanistan, MI6 worked closely with the military, delivering tactical information and working in small cells alongside Special Forces, surveillance teams, and GCHQ to track individuals from the Taliban and Al Qaeda.

The first MI6 knew of the US carrying out the mission that killed Osama Bin Laden on 2 May 2011 was after it happened, when its chief called his American counterpart for an explanation. In July 2011 it was reported that SIS had closed several of its stations, particularly in Iraq, where it had several outposts in the south of the country in the region of Basra. The closures have allowed the service to focus its attention on Pakistan and Afghanistan, which are its principal stations. On 12 July 2011, MI6 intelligence officers, along with other intelligence agencies, tracked two British-Afghans to a hotel in Herat, Afghanistan, who were discovered to be trying to establish contact with the Taliban or al-Qaeda to learn bomb-making skills; operators from the SAS captured them and they are believed to be the first Britons to be captured alive in Afghanistan since 2001.

By 2012, MI6 had reorganised after 9/11 and reshuffled its staff, opening new stations overseas, with Islamabad becoming the largest station. MI6's increase in funding was not as large as that for MI5, and it still struggled to recruit at the required rate; former members were rehired to help out. MI6 maintained intelligence coverage of suspects as they moved from the UK overseas, particularity to Pakistan.

In October 2013, SIS appealed for reinforcements and extra staff from other intelligence agencies amid growing concern about a terrorist threat from Afghanistan and that the country would become an "intelligence vacuum" after British troops withdraw at the end of 2014.

In March 2016, it was reported that MI6 had been involved in the Libyan Civil War since January of that year, having been escorted by the SAS to meet with Libyan officials to discuss the supplying of weapons and training for the Syrian Army and the militias fighting against ISIS. In April 2016, it was revealed that MI6 teams with members of the Special Reconnaissance Regiment seconded to them had been deployed to Yemen to train Yemeni forces fighting AQAP, as well as identifying targets for drone strikes. In November 2016, The Independent reported that MI6, MI5 and GCHQ supplied the SAS and other British special forces a list of 200 British jihadists to kill or capture before they attempt to return to the UK. The jihadists are senior members of ISIS who pose a direct threat to the UK. Sources said SAS soldiers have been told that the mission could be the most important in the regiment's 75-year history.

Other activities
On 6 May 2004 it was announced that Sir Richard Dearlove was to be replaced as head of SIS by John Scarlett, former chairman of the Joint Intelligence Committee. Scarlett was an unusually high-profile appointment to the job, and gave evidence at the Hutton Inquiry.

SIS has been active in the Balkans, playing a vital role in hunting down people wanted by the International War Crimes Tribunal in The Hague. British intelligence operations in the Balkans are thought to have played a vital role in the handover of the former Yugoslav president Slobodan Milošević to The Hague; SIS was also heavily involved in the hunt for Radovan Karadžić and General Ratko Mladic, who are linked to a vast range of war crimes including the murder of Srebrenica's surrendering male population and organising the Siege of Sarajevo.

On 27 September 2004, it was reported that British spies across the Balkans, including an SIS officer in Belgrade and another spy in Sarajevo, were moved or forced to withdraw after they were publicly identified in a number of media reports planted by disgruntled local intelligence services – particularly in Croatia and Serbia. A third individual was branded a British spy in the Balkans and left the office of the High Representative in Bosnia, whilst a further two British intelligence officers working in Zagreb, remained in place despite their cover being blown in the local press. The exposure of the agents across the three capitals markedly undermined the British intelligence operations in the area, including SIS efforts to capture The Hague's most wanted men, which riled many local intelligence agencies in the Balkans, some of which are suspected of continuing ties to alleged war criminals. They were riled due to MI6 operating "not so much a spy network as a network of influence within Balkan security services and the media," said the director of the International Crisis Group in Serbia and Bosnia, which caused some of them to be "upset". In Serbia, the SIS station chief was forced to leave his post in August 2004 after a campaign against him led by the country's DB intelligence agency, where his work investigating the 2003 assassination of the reformist prime minister Zoran Djindjic won him few friends.

On 15 November 2006, SIS allowed an interview with current operations officers for the first time. The interview was on the Colin Murray Show on BBC Radio 1. The two officers (one male and one female) had their voices disguised for security reasons. The officers compared their real experience with the fictional portrayal of SIS in the James Bond films. While denying that there ever existed a "licence to kill" and reiterating that SIS operated under British law, the officers confirmed that there is a 'Q'-like figure who is head of the technology department, and that their director is referred to as 'C'. The officers described the lifestyle as quite glamorous and very varied, with plenty of overseas travel and adventure, and described their role primarily as intelligence gatherers, developing relationships with potential sources.

Sir John Sawers became head of the SIS in November 2009, the first outsider to head SIS in more than 40 years. Sawers came from the Diplomatic Service, previously having been the British Permanent Representative to the United Nations.

On 7 June 2011, John Sawers received Romania's President Traian Băsescu and George-Cristian Malor, the head of the Serviciul Roman de Informatii (SRI) at SIS headquarters.

Libyan Civil War
Five years before the Libyan Civil War, a UK Special Forces unit was formed called E Squadron which was composed of selected members of the 22nd SAS Regiment, the SBS and the SRR. It was tasked by the Director Special Forces to support MI6's operations (akin to the CIA's SAC – a covert paramilitary unit for SIS). It was not a formal squadron within the establishment of any individual UK Special Forces unit, but at the disposal of both the Director Special Forces and the SIS; previously, SIS relied primarily on contractor personnel. The Squadron carried out missions that required 'maximum discretion' in places that were 'off the radar or considered dangerous'; the Squadron's members often operated in plain clothes, with the full range of national support, such as false identities at its disposal. In early March 2011, during the Libyan Civil War, a covert operation in Libya involving E Squadron went wrong: The aim of the mission was to cement SIS's contacts with the rebels by flying in two SIS officers in a Chinook helicopter to meet a Libyan Intermediary in a town near Benghazi, who had promised to fix them up a meeting with the NTC. A team consisting of six E Squadron members (all from the SAS) and two SIS officers were flown into Libya by an RAF Special Forces Flight Chinook; the Squadron's members were carrying bags containing arms, ammunition, explosives, computers, maps and passports from at least four nationalities. Despite technical backup, the team landed in Libya without any prior agreement with the rebel leadership, and the plan failed as soon as the team landed. The locals became suspicious they were foreign mercenaries or spies and the team was detained by rebel forces and taken to a military base in Benghazi. They were then hauled before a senior rebel leader; the team told him that they were in the country to determine the rebels' needs and to offer assistance, but the discovery of British troops on the ground enraged the rebels who were fearful that Gaddafi would use such evidence to destroy the credibility of the NTC. Negotiations between senior rebel leaders and British officials in London finally led to their release and they were allowed to board HMS Cumberland.

On 16 November 2011 SIS warned the national transitional council in Benghazi after discovering details of planned strikes, said foreign secretary William Hague. 'The agencies obtained firm intelligence, were able to warn the NTC of the threat, and the attacks were prevented,' he said. In a rare speech on the intelligence agencies, he praised the key role played by SIS and GCHQ in bringing Gaddafi's 42-year dictatorship to an end, describing them as 'vital assets' with a 'fundamental and indispensable role' in keeping the nation safe. 'They worked to identify key political figures, develop contacts with the emerging opposition and provide political and military intelligence. 'Most importantly, they saved lives,' he said. The speech follows criticism that SIS had been too close to the Libyan regime and was involved in the extraordinary rendition of anti-Gaddafi activists. Mr Hague also defended controversial proposals for secrecy in civil courts in cases involving intelligence material.

In February 2013 Channel Four News reported on evidence of SIS spying on opponents of the Gaddafi regime and handing the information to the regime in Libya. The files looked at contained "a memorandum of understanding, dating from October 2002, detailing a two-day meeting in Libya between Gaddafi's external intelligence agency and two senior heads of SIS and one from MI5 outlining joint plans for "intelligence exchange, counter-terrorism and mutual co-operation".

2015 onwards
In February 2015, The Daily Telegraph reported that MI6 contacted their counterparts in the South African intelligence services to seek assistance in an effort to recruit a North Korean "asset" to spy on North Korea's nuclear programme. MI6 had contacted the man who had inside information on North Korea's nuclear programme, he considered the offer and wanted to arrange another meeting, but a year passed without MI6 hearing from him, which prompted them to request South African assistance when they learnt he would be travelling through South Africa. It is not known whether the North Korean man ever agreed to work for MI6.

In July 2020, it was revealed that intelligence officials from a number of repressive regimes received training from senior officials of MI6 and MI5 in last two days. In 2019, an 11-day International Intelligence Directors Course was attended by top intelligence officers from 26 countries, including Saudi Arabia, the United Arab Emirates, Egypt, Jordan, Oman, Nigeria, Cameroon, Algeria, Afghanistan and others. A British academic, Matthew Hedges questioned the UK's training programme for allowing officials of the UAE, where he was detained on false charges and faced psychological torture.

Cover name
MI6 is known sometimes to use Government Communications Bureau as a cover name, for example, when sponsoring research.

Personnel awards
MI6 personnel are recognised annually by King Charles III (formerly the Prince of Wales) at the Prince of Wales's Intelligence Community Awards at St James's Palace or Clarence House alongside members of the Security Service (MI5), and GCHQ. Awards and citations are given to teams within the agencies as well as individuals.

Centenary and art exhibition
The year 2009 was the centenary of the Secret Intelligence Service. An official history of the first forty years was commissioned to mark the occasion and was published in 2010. To further mark the centenary, the Secret Intelligence Service invited artist James Hart Dyke to become artist in residence.

A year with MI6 
A year with MI6 was a public art exhibition, showing a collection of paintings and drawings by artist James Hart Dyke to mark the centenary of the British Secret Intelligence Service. The project saw Hart Dyke working closely with the SIS for a year, both in the United Kingdom and abroad. The Service allowed Hart Dyke access to enable him to undertake the project, sending him on hostile environment courses to allow him to work in dangerous parts of the world, and admitting him into their Vauxhall Cross headquarters. The sensitivity of SIS work required Hart Dyke to maintain secrecy, and his access was carefully controlled.

The works were exhibited publicly to promote understanding of the SIS's work, and why their operations must be secret. The exhibition ran from 15 to 26 February 2011 at the Mount Street Galleries, Mayfair, London. More than 40 original oil paintings and many sketches and studies were exhibited after being screened for security; the content and meaning of some of the paintings was intentionally left ambiguous.

Notable people

 Cambridge Five, a Cold War Soviet spy ring
 Anthony Blunt (cryptonym: Johnson), MI5 officer and Soviet agent
 Guy Burgess (cryptonym: Hicks), SIS officer and Soviet agent
 John Cairncross (cryptonym: Liszt), SIS officer and Soviet agent
 Donald Maclean (cryptonym: Homer), SIS officer and Soviet agent
 Kim Philby (cryptonym: Stanley), SIS officer and Soviet agent
 David Cornwell (known as John le Carré), author, former SIS officer
 Andrew Fulton, chairman of the Scottish Conservative Party 
 Charles Cumming, author
 Paul Dukes, SIS officer and author
 Ian Fleming, author of James Bond novels, former NID officer
 Graham Greene, author, former SIS officer
 Bill Hudson, SIS agent
 Ralph Izzard, journalist, author, former NID officer
 Horst Kopkow, SS officer who worked for SIS after the Second World War
 W. Somerset Maugham, playwright, novelist, short-story writer, SIS agent in Switzerland and Russia before the October Revolution of 1917 in the Russian Empire
 Daphne Park,  clandestine senior controller, former head of station in Léopoldville. 
 Duško Popov, a Second World War double agent; he was the key for operations in Nazi Germany and, as an MI6 agent, he was the inspiration for Ian Fleming's James Bond 
 William Stephenson, head of the British Security Co-ordination during WWII
 Amy Elizabeth Thorpe, glamorous seductress who gathered information from diplomats during World War II.
 Richard Tomlinson, author, former SIS officer
 Valentine Vivian, Vice-Chief of SIS and head of counter-espionage, Section V
 Gareth Williams, seconded to SIS from GCHQ, died under suspicious circumstances.
 Krystyna Skarbek, aka Christine Granville, agent in Poland and Eastern Europe; later Special Operations Executive agent. 
 Aggie MacKenzie, TV presenter and journalist who spent two years working for MI6
 Meta Ramsay, former SIS Head of Station, member of the House of Lords
 Sidney Reilly, Ace of Spies, worked for SIS and others

Buildings

SIS headquarters

Since 1995, SIS headquarters has been at 85 Vauxhall Cross, along the Albert Embankment in Vauxhall on the south bank of the River Thames by Vauxhall Bridge, London. Previous headquarters have been Century House, 100 Westminster Bridge Road, Lambeth (1966–1995), 54 Broadway, off Victoria Street, London (1924–1966) and 2 Whitehall Court (1911–1922). Although SIS operated from Broadway, it made considerable use of the adjoining St. Ermin's Hotel. 

The new building was designed by Sir Terry Farrell and built by John Laing. The developer Regalian Properties approached the government in 1987 to see if they had any interest in the proposed building. At the same time, the Security Service MI5 was seeking alternative accommodation and co-location of the two services was studied. In the end, this proposal was abandoned due to the lack of buildings of adequate size (existing or proposed) and the security considerations of providing a single target for attacks. In December 1987, Prime Minister Margaret Thatcher's government approved the purchase of the new building for the SIS.

The building design was reviewed to incorporate the necessary protection for the UK's foreign intelligence-gathering agency. This includes overall increased security, extensive computer suites, technical areas, bomb blast protection, emergency back-up systems and protection against electronic eavesdropping. While the details and cost of construction have been released, about ten years after the original National Audit Office (NAO) report was written, some of the service's special requirements remain classified. The NAO report Thames House and Vauxhall Cross has certain details omitted, describing in detail the cost and problems of certain modifications, but not what these are. Rob Humphrey's London: The Rough Guide suggests one of these omitted modifications is a tunnel beneath the Thames to Whitehall. The NAO put the final cost at £135.05 million for site purchase and the basic building, or £152.6 million including the service's special requirements.

The setting of the SIS Headquarters was featured in the James Bond films GoldenEye, The World Is Not Enough, Die Another Day, Skyfall, and Spectre. SIS allowed filming of the building itself for the first time in The World is Not Enough for the pre-credits sequence, where a bomb hidden in a briefcase full of money is detonated inside the building, blowing out an exterior wall. A Daily Telegraph article said that the British government opposed the filming, but this was denied by a Foreign Office spokesperson. In Skyfall the building is once again attacked by an explosion, this time by a cyber attack turning on a gas line and igniting the fumes the blast results in eight MI6 agents inside being killed, after the attack SIS operations are moved to a secret underground facility. In Spectre, the building has been abandoned and due for demolition. The evil head of crime organisation SPECTRE, Ernst Stavro Blofeld, traps Agent 007 James Bond alongside the film's Bond girl Madeleine Swann inside the ruins of the building. Blofeld then detonated bombs planted in the building, demolishing what was left of the building fully, though Bond managed to save Swann and escape before the building exploded and then collapsed.

On the evening of 20 September 2000, the building was attacked using a Russian-built RPG-22 anti-tank rocket launcher. Striking the eighth floor, the missile caused only superficial damage. The Metropolitan Police Anti-Terrorist Branch attributed responsibility to the Real IRA.

Other buildings
Most other buildings are held or nominally occupied by the Foreign & Commonwealth Office. They include:
Hanslope Park: on the outskirts of Milton Keynes housing His Majesty's Government Communications Centre, which supports the Foreign, Commonwealth and Development Office and the British intelligence community.
Fort Monckton in Gosport, Hampshire: a former fort dating from the 1780s, rebuilt in the 1880s, is now the field operations training centre for SIS.
Special Forces Club: a private club in Knightsbridge catering exclusively to members, both current and retired, of the intelligence services in Britain and abroad, along with the Special Air Service (SAS).

The Circus
MI6 is nicknamed The Circus. Some say this was coined by John le Carré (former SIS officer David Cornwell) in his espionage novels and named after a fictional building on Cambridge Circus. Leo Marks explains in his World War II memoir Between Silk and Cyanide that the name arose because a section of the Special Operations Executive (SOE) was housed in a building at 1 Dorset Square, London, which had formerly belonged to the directors of Bertram Mills circus.

Chiefs

 1909–1923: Sir Mansfield Smith-Cumming, 
 1923–1939: Admiral Sir Hugh Sinclair, 
 1939–1952: Major General Sir Stewart Menzies, 
 1953–1956: Sir John Sinclair, 
 1956–1968: Sir Richard White, 
 1968–1973: Sir John Rennie, 
 1973–1978: Sir Maurice Oldfield, 
 1979–1982: Sir Dick Franks, 
 1982–1985: Sir Colin Figures, 
 1985–1989: Sir Christopher Curwen, 
 1989–1994: Sir Colin McColl, 
 1994–1999: Sir David Spedding, 
 1999–2004: Sir Richard Dearlove, 
 2004–2009: Sir John Scarlett, 
 2009–2014: Sir John Sawers, 
 2014–2020: Sir Alex Younger, 
 2020–: Richard Moore,

See also

 British intelligence agencies
 List of intelligence agencies
 History of espionage
 British Security Co-ordination, the WWII operation headed by William Stephenson in the Americas, set up by MI6
 Camp X, training facility in Canada for clandestine operators during WWII

Explanatory notes

References

Citations

General bibliography 
 Aldrich, Richard J. (2006). The Hidden Hand: Britain, America and Cold War Secret Intelligence, London, John Murray, 
 Aldrich, Richard J. and Rory Cormac (2016). The Black Door: Spies, Secret Intelligence and British Prime Ministers, London, Collins, 
 
 Bethell, N. (1984). The Great Betrayal: the Untold Story of Kim Philby's Biggest Coup, London, Hodder & Stoughton, .
 Borovik, G. (1994). The Philby Files, London, Little and Brown. .
 Bower, Tom. (1995). The Perfect English Spy: Sir Dick White and the Secret War, 1939–90, London, Heinemann, .
 Bristow, Desmond with Bill Bristow (1993). A Game of Moles: the Deceptions of an MI6 Officer, London, Little, Brown, .
 Cave Brown, A. (1987). "C": The Secret Life of Sir Stewart Graham Menzies, Spymaster to Winston Churchill, Macmillan, .
 Cavendish, A. (1990). Inside Intelligence, HarperCollins, .
 Corera, G. (2013). The Art of Betrayal: The Secret History of MI6, Pegasus Books, .
 Cormac, Rory (2018). Disrupt and Deny: Spies, Special Forces and the Secret Pursuit of British Foreign Policy, Oxford University Press.
 Davies, Philip H. J. (2004). MI6 and the Machinery of Spying London: Frank Cass,  (h/b).
 Davies, Philip H. J. (2005). 'The Machinery of Spying Breaks Down' in Studies in Intelligence, Summer 2005 Declassified Edition.
 Deacon, Richard (1985).  "C": A Biography of Sir Maurice Oldfield, Macdonald, .
 Dorril, Stephen (2001). MI6: Fifty Years of Special Operations, London: Fourth Estate, .
 
 Hayes, P. (2015). Queen of Spies: Daphne Park, Britain's Cold War Spy Master, Duckworth, .
 Hermiston, R. (2014). The Greatest Traitor: the Secret Lives of Agent George Blake, London, Aurum, .
 Humphrey, Rob (1999). London: The Rough Guide, Rough Guides, .
 
 Judd, Alan (1999). The quest for C : Sir Mansfield Cumming and the founding of the British Secret Service. London: HarperCollins, .
 .
 Read, Anthony,  and David Fisher (1984). Colonel Z: The Life and Times of a Master of Spies (London: Hodder and Stoughton 1984).
 Seeger, Kirsten Olstrup (2008). Friendly Fire (DK) . A biography of the author's father who was a member of the Danish resistance during the Second World War.
 Smith, Michael (2010). SIX: A History of Britain's Secret Intelligence Service Pt 1 Murder and Mayhem 1909–1939, London: Dialogue, .
 Smiley, Colonel David (1994). Irregular Regular. Norwich: Editions Michael Russell. . An autobiography of a British officer, honorary colonel of the Royal Horse Guards, David de Crespigny Smiley LVO, OBE, MC, who served in the Special Operations Executive during World War II (Albania, Thailand) and was a MI6 officer after the war (Poland, Malta, Oman, Yemen). 
 Tomlinson, Richard; Nick Fielding (2001). The Big Breach: From Top Secret to Maximum Security. Mainstream Publishing. .
 Vilasi, Colonna A. (2013). The History of MI-6, Penguin Group Publishing, UK/USA Release.
 Walton, Calder (2012). Empire of Secrets. London: Harperpress. .
 West, Nigel (1988). The Friends: Britain's Post-war Secret Intelligence Operations, London, Weidenfeld & Nicolson, .
 West, Nigel (2006). At Her Majesty's Secret Service: The Chiefs of Britain's Intelligence Agency, MI6. London, Greenhill. .

External links

 
  from the Foreign and Commonwealth Office's website
 BBC interview with MI6 spy. BBC's The One show presenter interviews MI6 spy

 
1909 establishments in the United Kingdom
British intelligence agencies
British intelligence services of World War II
Foreign Office during World War II
Government agencies established in 1909
Intelligence services of World War II
Organisations based in the London Borough of Lambeth